"Pilot" is the first episode of the American serial drama The West Wing. The episode aired on September 22, 1999 on NBC.

Plot
The White House staff is being called into work early to deal with the press fallout after President Josiah Bartlet has crashed his bicycle into a tree. As the staff try to perform damage control, it is revealed that Deputy Chief of Staff Josh Lyman made a gaffe when, after provocation by Christian activist Mary Marsh on a recent televised debate, quipped "Lady, the God you pray to is too busy being indicted for tax fraud." Also, Deputy Communications Director Sam Seaborn spends an evening with Laurie (Lisa Edelstein), unaware that she's a call girl, and then tells Chief of Staff Leo McGarry's daughter, Mallory O'Brien, about it before he knows whose daughter she is.

While Lyman and Marsh are discussing a proposed public debate on one of several religious wedge issues, President Bartlet enters and corrects one of the attendees on a theological point (namely, he quotes the First Commandment, settling a dispute on which one it is). He explains that he crashed his bicycle while distracted by anger after discovering that his granddaughter, after expressing herself as pro-choice during a magazine interview, was mailed a Raggedy Ann doll with a knife stuck in its throat. The doll was sent by an extremist group whose activities the attendees, to his displeasure, have not denounced. He tells them that not only will there be no debate, but that they will denounce the extremists publicly, and are barred from the White House until they do so. Bartlet implies to Lyman that he will be allowed to keep his job despite the gaffe.

Reactions
 L. Brent Bozell III wrote that he felt the episode promoted anti-Catholicism.

Awards
 The pilot was nominated for an ASC award.

Emmy Awards
Won
 Outstanding Art Direction for a Single-Camera Series (recipients: Tony Fanning, Jon Hutman, and Ellen Totleben)
 Outstanding Cinematography for a Single-Camera Series (recipient: Thomas Del Ruth, A.S.C.)
 Outstanding Directing for a Drama Series (recipient: Thomas Schlamme)
Nominated
 Outstanding Writing for a Drama Series (nominee: Aaron Sorkin; "In Excelsis Deo," in the same category, won)

References

External links
 

The West Wing (season 1) episodes
West Wing, The
1999 American television episodes
Emmy Award-winning episodes